Rory O'Carroll (born 30 November 1989) is a footballer and hurler with Dublin and Kilmacud Crokes. He lined out as the full back on the Dublin senior football team. He is the brother of inter-county footballer and hurler Ross O'Carroll, inter-county hurler Bill O’Carroll and Oisin O'Carroll. Rory O'Carroll made his debut for Dublin against Kerry in March 2009.

Playing career
O'Carroll holds two All-Ireland medals. In 2009, he won an All-Ireland Senior Club Football Championship winners medal with Kilmacud Crokes and in 2010, he won the All-Ireland Under 21 Football Championship with Dublin. He was named on the team chosen as the best 15 players at Under-21 level between 2005 and 2010. O'Carroll won the Leinster Senior Football Championship with Dublin in July 2011 at Croke Park against Wexford. He won the All-Ireland Senior Football Championship with Dublin in September 2011 against Kerry at Croke Park.

Personal
O'Carroll went to Oatlands in Stillorgan, and was a student in University College Dublin (UCD), where he studied French and History and played for the college GAA teams. He is also well known for engaging in charitable work in Dublin's inner city, in particular Brother Kevin's Capuchin centre in Smithfield. He is also a keen and capable Irish speaker.

Honours
Football
 All-Ireland Senior Football Championship (3): 2011, 2013, 2015
 Leinster Senior Football Championship (5): 2011, 2012, 2013, 2014, 2015
 All-Ireland Under-21 Football Championship (1): 2010
 Leinster Under-21 Football Championship (2): 2009, 2010
 All-Ireland Senior Club Football Championship (1): 2009
 Leinster Senior Club Football Championship (2): 2008, 2010
 Dublin Senior Football Championship (2): 2008, 2010

Hurling
 Dublin Senior Hurling Championship (1): 2012
 Leinster Under-21 Hurling Championship (1): 2010
 Leinster Minor Hurling Championship (1): 2007

References

1989 births
Living people
Alumni of University College Dublin
Dual players
Dublin inter-county Gaelic footballers
Dublin inter-county hurlers
Gaelic football backs
Hurling backs
Kilmacud Crokes Gaelic footballers
Kilmacud Crokes hurlers
Winners of three All-Ireland medals (Gaelic football)